Thomas J. Kalman (December 21, 1917 – June 9, 2012) was a member of the Pennsylvania State Senate, serving from 1957 to 1970.

References

Democratic Party Pennsylvania state senators
1917 births
2012 deaths